Infestation is the state of being invaded or overrun by pests or parasites. It can also refer to the actual organisms living on or within a host.

Terminology 
In general, the term "infestation" refers to parasitic diseases caused by animals such as arthropods (i.e. mites, ticks, and lice) and worms, but excluding (except) conditions caused by protozoa, fungi, bacteria, and viruses, which are called infections.

External and internal 
Infestations can be classified as either external or internal with regards to the parasites' location in relation to the host.

External or ectoparasitic infestation is a condition in which organisms live primarily on the surface of the host (though porocephaliasis can penetrate viscerally) and includes those involving mites, ticks, head lice and bed bugs.

An internal (or endoparasitic) infestation is a condition in which organisms live within the host and includes those involving worms (though swimmer's itch stays near the surface).

Medically, the term "infestation" is often reserved only for external ectoparasitic infestations while the term infection refers to internal endoparasitic conditions.

References

External links 
 Introduction to Anaerobic Soil Disinfestation as a Fumigant Alternative
 New technique predicts risk of plant disease and infestation

Pests (organism)

de:Entwesung